UFC Fight Night: Machida vs. Mousasi (also known as UFC Fight Night 36) was a mixed martial arts event held on February 15, 2014, at the Arena Jaraguá in Jaraguá do Sul, Brazil.  The event was broadcast live on Fox Sports 1.

Background
The event was headlined by a middleweight bout between former world champions Lyoto Machida and Gegard Mousasi.

Returning veteran Nate Loughran was expected to face Erick Silva at the event.  However, Loughran was forced out of the bout with an injury and was replaced by promotional newcomer Takenori Sato.

Zubaira Tukhugov was expected to face Thiago Tavares at this event. However, Tavares was forced to pull out due to an undisclosed injury, and was replaced by UFC newcomer Douglas Silva de Andrade.

This event was the first one to feature the new post-fight bonus structure. Fight of the Night bonuses remained, while the Submission of the Night and Knockout of the Night were both replaced by two Performance of the Night bonuses. They were awarded to fighters who display "the two best individual performances on the card," according to a statement released by the UFC.

Results

Bonus awards
The following fighters were awarded $50,000 bonuses:
 Fight of the Night: Lyoto Machida vs. Gegard Mousasi
 Performance of the Night: Erick Silva and Charles Oliveira

Records set
The event equaled the record of most decisions on a UFC card set at UFC 169, with ten decisions. The event also had a total fight time of 2:53:32, setting a new record for the longest event in UFC history, beating the previous record of 2:51:14, also set at UFC 169. The record was later broken by UFC Fight Night: Werdum vs. Tybura which had fight time of 3 hours, 4 minutes and 18 seconds.

See also
List of UFC events
2014 in UFC

References

UFC Fight Night
2014 in mixed martial arts
Mixed martial arts in Brazil
Sport in Jaraguá do Sul
2014 in Brazilian sport